Ramón Búa Otero (April 28, 1933 – April 21, 2012) was the Roman Catholic bishop of the Roman Catholic Diocese of Calahorra y La Calzada-Lagroño, Origin Spain.

Ordained in 1961, he became bishop in 1982 resigning in 2003.

Notes

20th-century Roman Catholic bishops in Spain
1933 births
2012 deaths
Bishops of Tarazona
21st-century Roman Catholic bishops in Spain